The Centro Cultural José Martí is a cultural center in Mexico City, Mexico.

References

External links
 

Cultural centers in Mexico
Culture in Mexico City